, the World Checklist of Selected Plant Families lists 105 species of Crinum:

 Crinum abyssinicum Hochst. ex A.Rich. – N.E. Tropical Africa
 Crinum acaule Baker – KwaZulu-Natal
 Crinum album (Forssk.) Herb. – S.W. Arabian Pen
 Crinum amazonicum Ravenna – N. Brazil
 Crinum americanum L. – S.E. U.S.A. to Mexico, W. Caribbean
 Crinum amoenum Ker Gawl. ex Roxb. – Central Himalaya to Myanmar
 Crinum amphibium Bjorå & Nordal – Cameroon
 Crinum arenarium Herb. – N. Australia
 Crinum asiaticum L. – Indian Ocean, Tropical & Subtropical Asia to S.W. Pacific
 Crinum aurantiacum Lehmiller – Zambia to N. Malawi
 Crinum bakeri K.Schum. – N.W. Pacific
 Crinum balfourii Baker – Socotra
 Crinum bambusetum Nordal & Sebsebe – W. Ethiopia to Sudan
 Crinum belleymei Hérincq – Paraguay
 Crinum biflorum Rottb. – W. Tropical Africa to Sudan
 Crinum binghamii Nordal & Kwembeya – W. Zambia
 Crinum brachynema Herb. – W. India
 Crinum braunii Harms – Madagascar
 Crinum brevilobatum McCue – Central America
 Crinum bulbispermum (Burm.f.) Milne-Redh. & Schweick. – S. Africa
 Crinum buphanoides Welw. ex Baker – S. Tropical & S. Africa
 Crinum calamistratum Bogner & Heine – Cameroon
 Crinum campanulatum Herb. – E. Cape Province
 Crinum carolo-schmidtii Dinter – Caprivi Strip to N. Botswana
 Crinum crassicaule Baker – S. Tropical & S. Africa
 Crinum darienense Woodson – Panama
 Crinum eleonorae Blatt. & McCann – W. India
 Crinum erubescens L.f. ex Aiton – Mexico to S. Tropical America
 Crinum erythrophyllum Carey ex Herb. – Myanmar
 Crinum filifolium H.Perrier – W. Madagascar
 Crinum fimbriatulum Baker – Angola
 Crinum firmifolium Baker – Madagascar
 Crinum flaccidum Herb. – W., Central & E. Australia
 Crinum forgetii C.H.Wright – Peru
 Crinum giessii Lehmiller – Namibia
 Crinum glaucum A.Chev. – W. Tropical Africa to Uganda
 Crinum gracile G.Mey. ex C.Presl – Malesia to New Guinea
 Crinum graciliflorum Kunth & C.D.Bouché – Colombia to N. Venezuela
 Crinum graminicola I.Verd. – Northern Province to KwaZulu-Natal
 Crinum hanitrae Lehmiller & Sisk – Madagascar
 Crinum hardyi Lehmiller – Madagascar
 Crinum harmsii Baker – N.W. Zambia to Namibia
 Crinum hildebrandtii Vatke – Comoros
 Crinum humile Herb. – India
 Crinum jagus (J.Thomps.) Dandy – Tropical Africa
 Crinum jasonii Bjorå & Nordal – S.E. Zambia
 Crinum kirkii Baker – E. Tropical Africa to Mozambique
 Crinum kunthianum M.Roem. – Central America to Ecuador
 Crinum latifolium L. – India to S. China.
 Crinum lavrani Lehmiller – Madagascar
 Crinum lineare L.f. – E. Cape Province
 Crinum longitubum Pax – Angola
 Crinum lorifolium Roxb. – India, Myanmar
 Crinum lugardiae N.E.Br. – S. Africa
 Crinum macowanii Baker – Eritrea to S. Africa, Seychelles
 Crinum majakallense Baker – Angola
 Crinum malabaricum Lekhak & S.R.Yadav – India (Kerala)
 Crinum mauritianum G.Lodd. – Mauritius (Barrage de Midlands)
 Crinum mccoyi Lehmiller – Madagascar
 Crinum minimum Milne-Redh. – Tanzania to S. Tropical Africa
 Crinum modestum Baker – N.W. Madagascar
 Crinum moorei Hook.f. – E. Cape Province to KwaZulu-Natal
 Crinum natans Baker – W. & W. Central Tropical Africa
 Crinum nordaliae Mabb. – Angola
 Crinum nubicum L.S.Hannibal – W. Tropical Africa to Chad
 Crinum oliganthum Urb. – Central Cuba
 Crinum ornatum (Aiton) Herb. – Tropical Africa to Namibia
 Crinum paludosum Verd. – S. Tropical & S. Africa
 Crinum palustre Urb. – Haiti
 Crinum papillosum Nordal – S.W. Tanzania to N. Zambia
 Crinum parvibulbosum Dinter ex Overkott – Namibia
 Crinum parvum Baker – Mozambique
 Crinum piliferum Nordal – N. Kenya
 Crinum politifolium R.Wahlstr. – Tanzania
 Crinum pronkii Lehmiller – Madagascar
 Crinum purpurascens Herb. – W. Tropical Africa to Sudan and Angola
 Crinum pusillum Herb. – Nicobar Is
 Crinum rautanenianum Schinz – Zambia to N. Botswana
 Crinum razafindratsiraea LehMill. – Madagascar
 Crinum roperense Lehmiller & Lykos – Northern Territory
 Crinum salsum Ravenna – Brazil (Rio de Janeiro)
 Crinum scillifolium A.Chev. – W. Tropical Africa
 Crinum serrulatum Baker – Cambodia
 Crinum stapfianum Kraenzl. – W. Central Brazil
 Crinum stenophyllum Baker – Myanmar
 Crinum stracheyi Baker – Uttarakhand
 Crinum stuhlmannii Baker – Somalia to S. Africa
 Crinum subcernuum Baker – S.E. Tanzania to N. Botswana
 Crinum surinamense Ravenna – Suriname
 Crinum thaianum J.Schulze – Thailand
 Crinum trifidum Nordal – Angola
 Crinum undulatum Hook. – Brazil to N. Peru
 Crinum uniflorum F.Muell. – N. Australia
 Crinum variabile (Jacq.) Herb. – Cape Province
 Crinum venosum R.Br. – N. Northern Territory to N. Queensland
 Crinum verdoorniae Lehmiller – S. Tropical Africa to Caprivi Strip
 Crinum virgineum Mart. ex Schult. & Schult.f. – S.E. Brazil
 Crinum viviparum (Lam.) R.Ansari & V.J.Nair – Indian Subcontinent to Indo-China
 Crinum walteri Overkott – S. Tropical & S. Africa
 Crinum wattii Baker – Assam to Thailand
 Crinum welwitschii Baker – Angola
 Crinum wimbushi Worsley – Malawi
 Crinum woodrowii Baker – India (Maharashtra: Kates Point)
 Crinum xerophilum H.Perrier ex Lehmiller – S.W. Madagascar
 Crinum zeylanicum (L.) L. – Seychelles, S.W. India, Sri Lanka

References

Crinum